Tom Dunmore is the former editor-in-chief of Stuff magazine and a freelance journalist. Dunmore was previously the editor of Rip n Burn, the United Kingdom's first magazine dedicated to download culture.

Career

After studying film and literature at the University of Warwick in the early 1990s, Dunmore began his career in journalism as a television listings sub-editor for the Press Association. In 1999, after five years doing listings, Dunmore joined Haymarket Publishing's Stuff as a sub-editor. He took over as editor in 2002.

References

External links
 Stuff magazine's official website
Journalisted - Articles by Tom Dunmore

Alumni of the University of Warwick
British male journalists
Year of birth missing (living people)
Living people